Dulwich High School of Visual Arts & Design (abbreviated as DHSVAD) is a government coeducational specialist secondary school, with speciality in visual arts and design, located in Dulwich Hill, an inner western suburb of Sydney, New South Wales, Australia.

Re-established in 2003, the school is run by the New South Wales Department of Education and Training. The School offers a comprehensive education program with a strong focus on visual arts and design throughout all years and subjects.
DHSVAD is affiliated with the National Art School, The Design Centre Enmore TAFE, and The Art Gallery of NSW.

The School also runs a program called NEO. Year 8-10 Students engage in visual art and design-orientated workshops each week according to their area of interest. Subjects include Web Design, Robotics, Cartooning, Animation, Jewellery Making, Ceramics, Food Design, Design Your School Museum, and the most popular being Draw/Design/Make.

History 
The school officially became a Visual Arts and Design High School in 2003 as the first visual arts and design high school in New South Wales.

School facilities 
The campus is located on Seaview Street, Dulwich Hill off Marrickville Road. The campus has gardens, a paved playground, a grass oval, and a school vegetable garden. The various faculties within the school are located in different areas ranging from A to I Block including a covered basketball court (COLA) and a gymnasium located near the school canteen area. 
 
There are various murals around the school produced by the "Street Art Club" as well as artwork displayed around the corridors and foyer areas. The school library provides a relaxed environment. The Visual Arts specialty building built in 2004, features specially designed visual arts studios, a digital media/computer room equipped with design software, an art gallery, and a sculpture garden. There are two additional art classrooms, a senior students' Body of Work Studio, and artist-in-residence room, a ceramics room, and photographic darkroom facilities. The office of Artexpress is also situated on the school campus.

Faculty 
The faculties in the school include:
 Design and Technology
 Drama
 English
 Gifted and Talented Programme
 Human Society and Its Environment
 Japanese Language
 Mathematics
 Music
 Personal Development, Health and Physical Education
 Science
 Special Needs Unit (IM and IO)
 Visual Arts

Students 
The student body is just over 650 students.

Year 7 intake is streamed into half local area intake and half visual arts and design specialist intake.

Students are picked for the specialist stream based on portfolio, interview, and academic history.  Interview times for year 6 students applying for year 7 occur twice a year. Years 7 and 8  students receive additional allocated class time for visual arts lessons.

School life 
The school focuses on the "3 Rs" as its core guiding principle: Respect, Relationships, and Responsibility. Students come from a diverse range of cultural, ethnic, and economic backgrounds. The school is known for its acceptance of all kinds of people and is recognized as a "Proud School" which promotes equality of LGBTI-identifying people. Diversity Day is an anticipated event in the school calendar.

Student leadership

Prefect body 
The prefecture at DHSVAD consists of eight year 12 students who are elected by both their fellow students and teachers.

Student Representative Council
Dulwich High School of Visual Arts and Design has an elected Student Representative Council (SRC) composed of up to four students from each grade and the two School Captains and Vice Captains. The SRC's primary objectives are to provide input on policies that affects students and to run charity fundraisers

Support unit
The school has a total of three classes that cater to the specific learning needs of students from Year 7 to Year 12.
There are two classes specializing in support for students with intellectually moderate disabilities (IO):
Olley Class (IO) – Year 7, Year 8, and Year 9
Nolan Class (IO) – Year 10, Year 11, and Year 12.
There is one class specializing in support for students with intellectually mild disabilities (IM)

Preston Class (IM) – Years 7-12.

Events
Major yearly events:
 Diversity and wear it purple day
 Winter Gala
 Sports Day
 Yr 12 Graduation 
 End of Year Beach and Pool Celebration

See also 

 List of government schools in New South Wales
 List of fictional magic schools 
 Education in Australia

References

https://www.google.com/search?gs_ssp=eJzj4tLP1TcwLk8zKkw2YLRSNagwSzI0SjIwNzczME01NzUytDKoSDNPTjQxSk5JTDM2STMzsfSSSCnNKc9MzlDIyMzJARLpGQrFyRn5-TkARuYXUg&q=dulwich+hill+high+school&rlz=1C1VDKB_en-GBAU939AU939&oq=dul&aqs=chrome.

External links

Public high schools in Sydney
2003 establishments in Australia
Educational institutions established in 2003
Inner West